St. Joseph's Hospital is a hospital in Raheny, on the Northside of Dublin in Ireland. It is used as a rehabilitation hospital for patients of the Beaumont Hospital in Dublin.

History
The hospital was founded in Edenmore House in Raheny by the Sisters of St. Joseph of Chambéry as St. Joseph's Nursing Home in 1958. It operated as a private hospital until 2001 when it was acquired by the Health Service Executive. It was then transferred to the management of the Beaumont Hospital in 2004. The Beaumont Hospital established a new 14-bed rehabilitation centre at St. Joseph's Hospital in March 2005 a community nursing unit was completed there in 2010 and a care for the elderly unit was officially opened there by the Taoiseach, Enda Kenny, in July 2014.

Notes

References

Hospitals in Dublin (city)
Raheny
Hospitals established in 1958
Health Service Executive hospitals
Catholic hospitals in Europe
1958 establishments in Ireland